Colin Simpson may refer to:

Colin Simpson (author), software developer and author of textbooks
Colin Hall Simpson (1894–1964), Australian general
Colin M. Simpson (born 1959), Wyoming politician
Colin Simpson (EastEnders), a minor character in BBC's EastEnders
Colin Simpson (journalist) (1931–2017), war correspondent and investigative journalist for The Sunday Times
Colin Simpson (journalist and author) (1908–1983), Australian journalist, author and traveller